Savannah/Hilton Head International Airport  is a commercial and military-use airport in Savannah, Georgia, United States. Savannah/Hilton Head International provides travelers with access to Savannah, Georgia, and Hilton Head Island, South Carolina, as well as neighboring areas including Bluffton and Beaufort, South Carolina and the Golden Isles region of Coastal Georgia.

Owned by the City of Savannah and managed by the Savannah Airport Commission, Savannah/Hilton Head International is located seven nautical miles (8 mi, 13 km) northwest of the Savannah Historic District. The airport's passenger terminal is directly accessible to Interstate 95 between Savannah and the suburban city of Pooler. Its previous names include Savannah International Airport, Travis Field and Chatham Field.

This airport is included in the National Plan of Integrated Airport Systems for 2011–2015, which categorized it as a primary commercial service airport since it has over 10,000 passenger boardings (enplanements) per year. U.S. Customs facilities are on the field and the airport is part of a Foreign Trade Zone.

History
The first Savannah Municipal Airport was opened on September 20, 1929, with the inauguration of air service between New York City and Miami by Eastern Air Express. In 1932, a city resolution named the airport Hunter Field. A trolley car was used as the first terminal at Hunter Field in the mid-1930s. In 1940, the U.S. Army Air Corps proposed to take over Hunter Field if a war started. While commercial airlines continued to use Hunter Field, the city decided to build a second municipal airport in response to the increased military presence.

The City of Savannah acquired a 600-acre tract near Cherokee Hill, one of the highest elevations in the county, and construction of a new airfield began under a Works Progress Administration project. Three 3,600-foot runways were constructed running north–south, east–west, and northeast–southwest. In 1942, before the completion of this new airfield, the U.S. Army Air Corps decided to take over the new facility and start additional construction to carry out its mission. It named the airfield Chatham Field and used it until the end of World War II as a bomber base and crew training base for B-24 bombers as well as fighter aircraft.

In 1948, Chatham Army Airfield was turned over to the Georgia Air National Guard and the airport was renamed Travis Field, in honor of Savannah native Brigadier General Robert F. Travis, killed in the crash of a B-29 bomber near Fairfield-Suisun AFB, California, and his brother, Colonel William Travis. To accommodate the airlines, Travis Field received a new control tower and an airline terminal in the former base theater.

In 1958, work began on a new airline terminal. The jet age arrived in 1965 when Delta Air Lines introduced Douglas DC-9-10 flights. Grumman Aircraft opened a $7.5 million Gulfstream manufacturing plant at Travis in 1967. A new $21-million terminal building was built on the northwest corner of the airport in 1994.

A six-gate terminal built-in 1960 was replaced in 1994 by the current facility.  Although the airport had no direct international flights at the time, it was renamed Savannah International Airport in 1983, then Savannah/Hilton Head International Airport in 2003.

In 1992, the airport had international service with nonstop flights to destinations in the Caribbean and Mexico when Key Airlines was operating a passenger hub in Savannah. Key Airlines also operated nonstop mainline jet service to a number of U.S. cities at this time and from Savannah.  According to the Key Airlines system timetable dated October 1, 1992, nonstop services primarily operated with Boeing 727-100 and 727-200 jetliners were being flown from the airport to Antigua (ANU), Aruba (AUA), Atlanta (ATL), Baltimore (BWI), Boston (BOS), Cancun (CUN), Chicago Midway Airport (MDW), Cozumel (CZM), Curaçao (CUR), Freeport (FPO), Montego Bay (MBJ), Nassau (NAS), New York Newark Airport (EWR), Orlando (MCO), St. Maarten (SXM) and St. Thomas (STT).  In addition to these nonstop flights, one-stop direct service was also flown by the airline from Savannah to St. Croix (STX). Key Airlines subsequently experienced financial difficulties and then ceased all flights in 1993.

Some  from the west end of Runway 10 (the main east–west runway) are two concrete grave markers. A runway extension project placed the runway through a small family plot and the graves of the airport property's two original owners. Because the family did not want to remove and relocate the graves, the markers were placed on the asphalt runway.

Runway 10 is thought to be the only airport runway in the United States with marked gravestones in it.  Federal law generally prohibits the moving of a grave without the permission of the next of kin. In this case, two graves of the Dotson Family, the earliest grave dating backed to 1857, were encountered during the construction of the runway. Since the next of kin could not be located, the graves were left undisturbed. Two additional graves are located off the runway surface.

The new 275,000-sq.-ft. terminal opened in May 1994 with eight gates (expandable to 19 gates). The project included new roads, a new aircraft taxiway and parking apron, stormwater ponds, landscaping, and a new interchange at I-95 for entry into the Airport (Exit 104) at mile marker 104. The total cost for the project was $68.5 million. It was completed one month ahead of schedule and under budget. It was designed by KBJ Architects.

A terminal expansion project was completed in July 2007, adding five departure gates (for a total of 15). A $35 million parking garage was completed in October of the same year, adding 1,700 parking spaces and uses an electronic program to alert drivers to the number of available spaces on each garage level.

International service was finally resumed in 2017 when Air Canada began seasonal service between Toronto and Savannah.

For the second year in a row, the airport was named the #1 Best Domestic Airport in Travel+Leisure World's Best Awards 2022 as a result of a survey by its readers. Airport accessibility, shopping, check-in, security, restaurants, cleanliness and other factors contributed to the airport's top US rating. Condé Nast Traveler magazine also ranked Savannah/Hilton Head International Airport the US #1 airport for the third year in a row by its readers as well.

Facilities
Savannah/Hilton Head International Airport covers an area of 3,650 acres (1,477 ha) at an elevation of 50 ft. (15 m) above mean sea level. It has two runways with concrete surfaces:
 10/28: 9,351 ft. x 150 ft. (2,850 m x 46 m)
 01/19: 7,002 ft. x 150 ft. (2,134 m x 46 m)

For the 12-month period ending July 31, 2022, the airport had 116,654 aircraft operations, an average of 309 per day: 54% general aviation, 12% air taxi, 26% scheduled commercial, and 7% military. At that time there were 150 aircraft based at this airport: 82 single-engine, 27 multi-engine, 29 jet, 4 helicopter, and 8 military.

Future Expansion 

To accommodate the rapid growth of the airport, SAV is planning an expansion project. The first part of the expansion is set to break ground next year, in which the TSA screening area will be expanded from four lanes to six. Once the extra security capacity is in place, SAV plans to add four additional gates to the terminal, bringing the total from fifteen to nineteen (this project is still in the design phase). Additional improvements include expansions of their parking, rental car facilities, and cargo capabilities.

Military

Also located on the airport is Savannah Air National Guard Base, home to the 165th Airlift Wing (165 AW) of the Georgia Air National Guard.  The 165 AW flies the C-130H Hercules tactical airlift aircraft and, as an Air National Guard (ANG) unit, is under the operational claimancy of the Air Mobility Command (AMC).  The 165 AW, including the collocated Georgia ANG Combat Readiness Training Center (CRTC), consists of over 310 full-time Active Guard and Reserve (AGR) and Air Reserve Technician (ART) personnel, and over 700 additional part-time traditional air national guardsmen (TG), also known as Drill Status Guardsmen (DSG).

Savannah ANGB has over 145 buildings and 239 acres of leased land in the southeast and northeast quadrants of the airport.

It is also home of the Air Dominance Center.

Airlines and destinations

Passenger

Cargo

Statistics

Traffic numbers

Airline market share

Top destinations

Accidents and incidents
All nine occupants were killed. See 2018 U.S. Air National Guard C-130 crash.

References

External links 

 Savannah / Hilton Head International Airport, official website
 Fixed-base operators (FBO): Signature Flight Support and Sheltair
 
 

Airports established in 1942
Airports in Georgia (U.S. state)
Buildings and structures in Savannah, Georgia
Transportation in Chatham County, Georgia
International Airport
Works Progress Administration in Georgia (U.S. state)
Special economic zones of the United States
1942 establishments in Georgia (U.S. state)